Sanaura is a village in Uttar Pradesh. Tehsil of Sanaura is Muhammadabad-Gohna. District is Mau. Nearby villages are Itaura Chaubepur, Devlas, Bhadid, and many more. The nearest market places are Devlas and Itaura Chaubepur, which are 2.5 km and 2 km away from the village respectively. All the population living in this village are migrants from the nearby village Bhadid. The nearest hospital is located in about 500m.

Villages in Mau district